Kyla Schuller is an academic and author who is employed by Rutgers University.

Works

References

Rutgers University faculty
Living people
Year of birth missing (living people)